Zain Alexander Walker (born 8 January 2002) is an English professional footballer who plays as a midfielder for King's Lynn Town.

Career

Bristol Rovers
Born in Wandsworth, Walker began his career with Fulham, moving to Bristol Rovers at the age of 16. He made his debut on 13 November 2018 in the EFL Trophy, one of four Bristol Rovers players (alongside Tareiq Holmes-Dennis, Connor Jones and Theo Widdrington) to do so in that match. Walker also became the first player born in the 2000s to play for Bristol Rovers.

On 4 September 2020, Walker signed a new two-year deal contract with Rovers with an option for a further year, following an impressive pre-season. Walker made his first league appearance for the club in a 4–1 defeat to Doncaster Rovers coming off of the bench in the 74 minute. Having featured off of the bench a few times, Rovers' third manager of the season Joey Barton promoted both Walker and fellow Development Squad player Pablo Martinez to train with the first team in early March 2021 as Rovers fought to avoid relegation.  Walker made his full debut for the club when he started on 27 March 2021 in a 1–0 home defeat to Sunderland.

On 8 September 2021, Walker joined National League side King's Lynn Town on a one-month youth loan deal. He made his debut that weekend, starting and playing 66 minutes of a 2–1 defeat to Dagenham & Redbridge.

On 12 November 2021, Walker joined National League South side Chippenham Town on loan along with his Rovers teammate Cameron Hargreaves. He made his debut the following day but was forced off after 30 minutes with a muscle injury.

King's Lynn Town
On 19 January 2022, Walker joined National League side King's Lynn Town for an undisclosed fee having spent time on loan there earlier in the season.

Career statistics

References

 

2002 births
Living people
Footballers from Wandsworth
English footballers
Association football midfielders
Fulham F.C. players
Bristol Rovers F.C. players
King's Lynn Town F.C. players
Chippenham Town F.C. players
English Football League players
National League (English football) players